Voice of China, or China Media Group, is the predominant state radio and television broadcaster in the People's Republic of China.

Voice of China may also refer to:
 The Voice of China, Chinese reality television singing competition 
 The Voice of China (radio channel), radio channel of China National Radio
 Voice of Free China, international broadcasting station of the Republic of China from 1949 until 1998